Linda Harper-Brown (born March 20, 1948) is an American politician who served as a member of the Texas House of Representatives from 2003 to 2015. She was a member of the House's Transportation Committee. Harper-Brown was previously elected to the Irving, Texas, city council in 1997.

Electoral history

References 

21st-century American politicians
Republican Party members of the Texas House of Representatives
1948 births
Living people